The 1900 Melbourne Cup was a two-mile handicap horse race which took place on Tuesday, 6 November 1900.

This race saw a 28-horse field compete. James Scobie a former Steeplechase jockey turned trainer had the first two placegetters after Clean Sweep beat Maltster by one and a half lengths; 25-1 shot Alix was third. Clean Sweep had won the Coongy Handicap at Caulfield before winning the Moonee Valley Cup at Moonee Valley. Jockey Andrew 'Dingo' Richardson only got the ride on Clean Sweep after Bobby Lewis who had his choice of all four of Scobie's runner choose Maltster who had won both the Australian Derby and Victoria Derby.

This is the list of placegetters for the 1900 Melbourne Cup.

See also

 Melbourne Cup
 List of Melbourne Cup winners
 Victoria Racing Club

References

External links
1900 Melbourne Cup Field footyjumpers.com

1900
Melbourne Cup
Melbourne Cup
20th century in Melbourne
1900s in Melbourne